Dudelange is a commune with town status in southern Luxembourg. It is the fourth-most populous commune, with 19,734 inhabitants. Dudelange is situated close to the border with France.

, the town of Dudelange, which lies in the centre of the commune, has a population of 19,734, making it Luxembourg's third-most populous town. The commune also includes the smaller town of Budersberg, to the north-west. The Mont Saint-Jean, close to Budersberg, hosts the ruins of a medieval castle. In 1794 the French Revolutionary Army committed atrocities against the local population in Dudelange, when they massacred 79 civilians.

Dudelange is an important industrial town that grew out of the three villages and a steel mill in 1900. The D in the name of the ARBED steel company, later merged into ArcelorMittal, stood for Dudelange. As well as the Dudelange Radio Tower, an FM radio and television transmitter, it is also the site of the Centre national de l’audiovisuel (CNA), a cultural institute founded in 1989 under the aegis of the Ministry of Culture in order to preserve, promote and exhibit Luxembourg's audiovisual and photographic heritage. The centre hosts a two-screen cinema, a restaurant and a library focused on the visual arts.

Population

Sports
Dudelange is home to Luxembourg's most successful football club in recent times. F91 Dudelange won nine national titles between 2000 and 2011.

Notable people

 Dominique Lang (1874–1919), Impressionist painter 
 Jean Hengen (1912–2005) was a Luxembourgian prelate of the Roman Catholic Church, Bishop of Luxembourg 1971-1990
 Pierre Cao (born 1937) a Luxembourgian composer and conductor
 Germaine Goetzinger (born 1947) a Luxembourg writer, historian, educator and feminist
 Jean Back (born 1953) a Luxembourg writer, photographer and civil servant
 Roland Bombardella (born 1957) a Luxembourgian soldier and retired sprinter, competed in the 1976 Summer Olympics
 Andy Bausch (born 1959) studied painting and photography, interested in rock music

 Sport
 Ernest Mengel (1913–1968) a Luxembourgian footballer, competed at the 1936 Summer Olympics
 Jos Romersa (1915–2016) a Luxembourgian gymnast who competed in the 1936 Summer Olympics 
 Camille Libar (1917–1991) a football player and manager from Luxembourg
 Nicolas Pauly (1919–1981) a Luxembourgian footballer, competed at the 1948 Summer Olympics
 Raymond Wagner (1921–1997) a Luxembourgian footballer, competed at the 1948 Summer Olympics
 Bernard Michaux (1921–1987) a Luxembourgian footballer, competed in the 1948 Summer Olympics
 Victor Feller (1923–1997) a Luxembourgian footballer, competed at the 1948 Summer Olympics
 Bruno Mattiussi (1926–1981) a Luxembourgian boxer, competed at light middleweight at the 1952 Summer Olympics
 Fred Stürmer (1927–2014) a Luxembourgian boxer, competed in the middleweight at the 1952 Summer Olympics
 Jean Schmit (1931–2010) a Luxembourgian cyclist, competed in the individual and team road race events at the 1952 Summer Olympics
 Jean Aniset (born 1934) a Luxembourgian long-distance runner, competed in the marathon at the 1964 Summer Olympics
 Henri Cirelli (1934–2021), international footballer
 Robert Schiel (born 1939) a Luxembourgian fencer, competed at the 1960, 1972 and 1976 Summer Olympics
 Roger Gilson (1947–1995) a Luxembourgian cyclist, competed in the individual road race at the 1968 Summer Olympics
 René Peters (born 1981) a Luxembourgish football player, former captain of the national team
 Kari Peters (born 1985) a Luxembourger cross-country skier, competed at the 2014 Winter Olympics 
 Ben Gastauer (born 1987), professional cyclist
 Fleur Maxwell (born 1988) a Luxembourgian figure skater, competed in the 2006 Winter Olympics

 Politics
 Nicolas Biever (1894–1965) a Luxembourgian politician
 Nicolas Estgen (1930–2019) a retired Luxembourgish politician
 Bernard Berg (1931–2019) a Luxembourgish politician and trade unionist
 Colette Flesch (born 1937) a Luxembourgish politician and former fencer, competed at the 1960, 1964 and 1968 Summer Olympics
 Erna Hennicot-Schoepges (born 1941) a Luxembourgish politician
 Mars Di Bartolomeo (born 1952) a Luxembourgish politician
 Alex Bodry (born 1958) a politician from Luxembourg.
 Lydia Mutsch (born 1961) a Luxembourgish politician
 Etienne Schneider (born 1971) a Luxembourg politician and economist, Deputy Prime Minister and Minister of the Economy.

Twin towns – sister cities

Dudelange is twinned with:

 Arganil, Portugal
 Berane, Montenegro
 Feltre, Italy
 Lauenburg, Germany
 Lębork, Poland
 Manom, France

See also

 List of mayors of Dudelange

References

External links

 
 Commune of Dudelange official website
 Miscellaneous links

 
Cities in Luxembourg
Communes in Esch-sur-Alzette (canton)
Towns in Luxembourg